= The Kansas Whip =

Newspaper in Topeka, Kansas

The Kansas Whip was a weekly African-American newspaper published in Topeka, Kansas. Beginning in 1934, the newspaper ran until its end in 1956 but not before undergoing two name changes. Starting off as The Kansas Whip, the name of the newspaper changed to the Kansas Eagle, and then finally to the Kansas American at some point between 1934 and 1956. Eugene Lucas is widely considered to be both the publisher and editor of the newspaper, and some sources cite the publishing company as The Eagle Pub. Co. The newspaper is political in nature, often regarded in support of the Democratic Party. The newspaper also featured advertisements.

== History ==
Beginning in 1934, the newspaper ran under the name The Kansas Whip, The Kansas Eagle, and The Kansas American before its discontinuation in 1956.

== Content ==
The newspaper covered political issues, often citing support toward Democratic policies and candidates. The newspaper also included a substantial number of advertisements for businesses, including hair salons, grocery stores, and other various services.
